The 2011 Indoor Cricket World Cup was the tenth edition of Indoor Cricket World Cup which took place between 9 and 15 October 2011 in Gauteng, South Africa.

Some divisions comprising the Junior World Series of Indoor Cricket took place alongside this event.

Host Selection
The World Cup was awarded to South Africa by the WICF at the conclusion of the previous World Cup. As a result, South Africa became the third nation to host the World Cup twice, having previously hosted the 2000 Indoor Cricket World Cup in Johannesburg.

Venue
South African administrators determined that Fourways Action Sports Arena in Gauteng would host all World Cup matches and Johannesburg became the host city as a result.

Participants
Men's Open
  Australia
  England
  India
  New Zealand
  South Africa
  South Africa Development
  Sri Lanka

Ladies Open
  Australia
  England
  South Africa
  South Africa Development
  Wales

Men's Open

Format
In the initial phase, the 7 teams will play a round-robin tournament whereby each team plays each one of the other teams once. After 6 games, the table splits into two sections of four teams (Top 4) and three teams (Bottom 3), with each team playing each other in their section. After the second round-robin, a finals phase is played: single-elimination bracket for Bottom 3 teams, and Page playoff bracket for Top 4.

Group stage points are awarded as follows:
Win: 3 points + Bonus points. 
Tied: 1.5 points + Bonus points. 
Loss: Bonus points.
Bonus points: 1 point for each skin won, regardless of match result.

Group stage
 Source

Bottom 3

Top 4

Finals

Bottom 3

Top 4

Ladies Open

Format
In the initial phase, the 5 teams will play a round-robin tournament whereby each team plays each one of the other teams twice. After 8 games, a play-off system resembling 2002-08 Super League Top Six format is played.

Group stage points are awarded as follows:
Win: 3 points + Bonus points. 
Tied: 1.5 points + Bonus points. 
Loss: Bonus points.
Bonus points: 1 point for each skin won, regardless of match result.

Group stage
 Source

Finals

See also
 Indoor Cricket World Cup
 2011 Junior World Series of Indoor Cricket

Notes

Indoor Cricket World Cup
Indoor Cricket World Cup